William Ribchester (28 July 1898 – 23 February 1986) was a Scottish footballer who played as an outside right.

The son of a Lancastrian schoolmaster who relocated to Govan, Ribchester began his senior career with Celtic in 1916, making two Scottish Football League appearances as an 18-year-old filling in for the injured Andy McAtee. World War I was already underway, and having already been a member of the Officers' Training Corps he was soon called into active duty, serving as a second lieutenant with the Machine Gun Corps and being wounded at Amiens in August 1918. He was able to resume playing football when the conflict ended, though he could not break into the Celtic team and moved on to Albion Rovers, playing in the 1920 Scottish Cup Final, a 3–2 loss to Kilmarnock, at the end of his first of three seasons in Coatbridge.

He later played for St Johnstone (initially on loan), being an almost constant presence in the side that won the 1923–24 Scottish Division Two title, though he played little in the following campaign (the club's first at Muirton Park) and was loaned back to the lower tier with Dunfermline Athletic, before ending his career with Armadale. Ribchester was later also a school teacher like his father.

References

1898 births
1986 deaths
Scottish footballers
Scottish people of English descent
People from Govan
Footballers from Glasgow
People educated at St Mungo's Academy
Benburb F.C. players
Celtic F.C. players
Parkhead F.C. players
St Johnstone F.C. players
Albion Rovers F.C. players
Dunfermline Athletic F.C. players
Armadale F.C. players
Association football outside forwards
Scottish Junior Football Association players
Scottish Football League players
British Army personnel of World War I
Machine Gun Corps officers